Sayed Nasir Ali Shah (Urdu and ) is a Pakistani politician and parliamentarian from the Pakistan Peoples Party who is an elected member of the National Assembly (MNA). Shah hails from the city of Quetta in Balochistan and belongs to the Shi'a Hazara community.

On 16 April 2010 he was severely injured in a suicide bomb blast planned against him causing several casualties and his son severely injured. On 6 October 2011, he staged a walkout and strike outside the Pakistani parliament in Islamabad while boycotting a session to protest the PPP-led government's apparent inability in curbing continuous sectarian attacks on Hazara people in Balochistan. Later, he was also joined in solidarity by members of the opposition Pakistan Muslim League (N). He held talks with Rehman Malik in which he demanded a solid plan to end sectarian killings in Quetta and also called for a complete dissolution of the Government of Balochistan which, according to him, had completely failed to maintain law and order in the province.

His father Haji Sayed Hussain Hazara was also a politician and leader.

See also 

 List of Hazara people
 List of people from Quetta
 Ataullah Mengal
 Akhtar Mengal
 Balochistan National Party
 Haji Syed Hussain Hazara

References 

Hazara politicians
Living people
Pakistan People's Party politicians
Pakistani Shia Muslims
Politicians from Quetta
Pakistani people of Hazara descent
1946 births